Dalton is an unincorporated community in Avon Township, Sumner County, Kansas, United States.  It is located about half way between Wellington and Oxford at the intersection of S Oliver Rd and E 15th St S, next to an abandoned railroad.

History
Dalton was a station on the Atchison, Topeka and Santa Fe Railway that previously passed through the community, east to west, from Oxford to Wellington.

A post office was opened in Dalton in 1885, and remained in operation until it was discontinued in 1939.

Education
The community is served by Oxford USD 358 public school district.

References

Further reading

External links
 Sumner County map, KDOT

Unincorporated communities in Sumner County, Kansas
Unincorporated communities in Kansas